"Rock and a Hard Place" is a song by the English rock band the Rolling Stones from their 1989 album Steel Wheels. It is the second single from the album, and remains the most recent Billboard top 40 hit by the band.

Recording
Credited to Mick Jagger and Keith Richards, "Rock and a Hard Place" was recorded at Montserrat's AIR Studios and London's Olympic Studios in the spring months of 1989. On the song, Richards said in the liner notes to the 1993 compilation album Jump Back (on which it was included), "This was like going back to the way we worked in the early days, before Exile, when we were living round the corner from each other in London. Mick and I hadn't got together in four years since Dirty Work, but as soon as we met up in Barbados for a fortnight, with a couple guitars and pianos, everything was fine." At the time of release, Jagger said, "This is one of those songs like "Start Me Up", where the minute you hear the opening notes, you head for the dance floor. It's real '70s, in the best possible way."

With Jagger on lead vocals, Richards, Ron Wood and Jagger perform guitars for the recording. Bill Wyman and Charlie Watts perform bass and drums, respectively. Keyboards are played by Matt Clifford and Chuck Leavell. The Kick Horns provided brass for the recording. Lisa Fischer, Sarah Dash and Bernard Fowler all perform backing vocals.

Release
"Rock and a Hard Place" was released as the second single from Steel Wheels on 13 November 1989 in the UK. "Cook Cook Blues", a slow blues outtake from the 1983 album Undercover, was the B-side. The single reached No. 63 in the UK, No. 23 in the U.S. and No. 1 on the Mainstream Rock Tracks chart. The song has been performed by the Stones sporadically since its release, appearing on the Steel Wheels/Urban Jungle Tour, Voodoo Lounge Tour, Bridges to Babylon Tour, and Licks Tour.

A music video was shot at Sullivan Stadium, in Foxborough, Massachusetts during the band's three sold out night stand at that venue and directed by Wayne Isham. The video reached the Top 10 of MTV's Top 20 Video Countdown in December, 1989.

A live recording captured during the Steel Wheels/Urban Jungle Tour was included on the live albums Flashpoint, Live at The Tokyo Dome and Steel Wheels Live.

The studio album and/or single version were included on the compilations Jump Back and Honk.

Track listing
"Rock and a Hard Place" – 4:05
"Cook Cook Blues" – 4:08

Charts

Weekly charts

Year-end charts

References

1989 singles
The Rolling Stones songs
1989 songs
Songs written by Jagger–Richards
Music videos directed by Wayne Isham
Song recordings produced by Jagger–Richards
Song recordings produced by Chris Kimsey